Arkansas's 3rd congressional district is a congressional district in the U.S. state of Arkansas. The district covers Northwest Arkansas and takes in Fort Smith, Fayetteville, Springdale, and Bentonville.

The district is represented by Republican Steve Womack.

Character
Wal-Mart's corporate headquarters are located in this district in Bentonville. The University of Arkansas is located in Fayetteville. Springdale is the home of Tyson Foods.

The district swung Republican long before the rest of the state. It has been in Republican hands continuously since the election of John Paul Hammerschmidt in 1966. However, conservative Democrats continued to hold most state and local offices well into the 1990s.

George W. Bush received 62% of the vote in this district in 2004. John McCain swept the district in 2008 with 64.16% of the vote while Barack Obama received 33.45% of the vote. It was McCain's best and Obama's worst performance in Arkansas.

Recent election results in statewide races

List of members representing the district

Recent election results

2002

2004

2006

2008

2010

2012

2014

2016

2018

2020

2022

Notes
Arkansas will hold their Primary Elections on May 24, 2022 – a process which the State of Arkansas calls a Preferential Primary Election. If no candidate in a contested Primary Election receives 50% of the vote or more of the vote, than a Runoff Primary Election will be held on June 21, 2022 – a process which the State of Arkansas calls a General Primary Election.

There are currently three declared candidates for Arkansas’ 3rd Congressional District for the 2022 Election Cycle.

The incumbent office holder is denoted by an *. Any rumored candidates are denoted by an +.

Arkansas will hold their General Election on November 8, 2022. If no candidate in a contested General Election race receives 50% or more of the vote, than a General Runoff Election will be held on December 8, 2022.

References
Specific

General

 Congressional Biographical Directory of the United States 1774–present

03